LaPorte County is a county located in the U.S. state of Indiana. As of 2010, the population was 111,467. The county seat is the city of La Porte, and the largest city is Michigan City. This county is part of the Northwest Indiana and Michiana regions of the Chicago metropolitan area. The LaPorte County Courthouse is located in the county seat of La Porte and is listed on the National Register of Historic Places.

History 
LaPorte County was formed in 1832. La porte means "the door" or "the port" in French. French travelers or explorers so named the area after discovering a natural opening in the dense forests that used to exist in this region, providing a gateway to lands further west.

From 1832 to 1835 LaPorte County had its boundaries and jurisdiction of the land west of it going all the way to the east border of Chicago in Cook County, IL (land which is now Porter and Lake Counties).

Before European-American settlement, all of the land that forms modern-day LaPorte County, and adjacent Starke County to the south belonged to the Potawatomi Indian nation. These Indians were forcibly removed to Kansas by the United States government in 1838, and many died on what survivors called the Trail of Death.

LaPorte County's initial European-American settlers were Yankee migrants, that is to say they were from New England or were from upstate New York and had parents who were from New England, and were descended from the English Puritans who settled New England in the colonial era.  They were part of a wave of New England settlers moving west into what was then the Northwest Territory after the completion of the Erie Canal through the Mohawk Valley of New York State.

These first settlers in LaPorte County specifically hailed from the Massachusetts towns of Granville, Boston, Bridgewater, West Bridgewater, Andover, Nantucket Island, and Hampshire County; the Connecticut towns of Colchester, Wethersfield, Granby, and New Haven; the New Hampshire towns of Bradford, Amherst and Goffstown; the Vermont villages of Dorset, Albany and Fairfax; many also came from Orange County, Vermont, Caledonia County, Vermont and Penobscot County, Maine.  They were mainly members of the Congregational Church. As result of the Second Great Awakening, many became Baptists and many also converted to Pentecostalism and Methodism.  When they arrived in what is now LaPorte County, there was nothing but virgin forest and prairie. The New England settlers cleared roads and brush, developed farms, constructed churches, erected government buildings, and established post routes.  As a result of this migration, La Porte County was partially culturally continuous with early New England culture for many years.

But by 1850, the three Eastern states that had contributed the most residents to LaPorte County were New York, Pennsylvania and Virginia, surpassing those migrants from New England. LaPorte County had the largest number of Southerners north of the Wabash Valley.

During the Civil War, the Louisville Journal noted that the 29th Indiana Regiment (mustered out of LaPorte) "may almost be regarded as a Kentucky regiment for a large majority of its members are either natives or descendants of native Kentuckians".  Three Union Camps reigned in LaPorte County helping the Union to Civil War victory.

When the county was initially proposed and organized, its boundaries did not extend as far south or east as they do today.  A section of land north of the Kankakee River originally belonged to Starke County.  However, residents living in that area had difficulty crossing the river in order to reach the rest of the county.  It was necessary to travel some distance east to Lemon's bridge, before making the journey south.  Effectively isolated from the rest of Starke County, these residents asked that their land be annexed to LaPorte County, which was completed on January 28, 1842.  Thereafter, the Kankakee River formed the southern boundary of the county.  Finally, on January 10, 1850, some twenty sections of land were annexed from St. Joseph County to the east, giving LaPorte County the boundaries that essentially exist to this day.

Whether the correct spelling of the city and county is "La Porte" or "LaPorte" is disputed, although state law refers to "LaPorte County."

LaPorte County is noted for being the place of the Belle Gunness serial murders. Gunness lived on a farm on the outskirts of the county seat.

Geography 

Adjacent counties
 Berrien County, Michigan (North/Eastern Time Zone Border)
 St. Joseph County (East/Eastern Time Zone Border)
 Starke County (South)
 Jasper County (Southwest)
 Porter County (West)

National protected area
 Indiana Dunes National Park – also in Lake and Porter counties

Major highways
 
 
  U.S. Route 6
  U.S. Route 12
  U.S. Route 20
  U.S. Route 30
  U.S. Route 35
  U.S. Route 421
  State Road 2
  State Road 4
  State Road 8
  State Road 39
  State Road 104
  State Road 212

Railroads 
 Canadian National Railway
 Chesapeake and Indiana Railroad
 Chicago, Fort Wayne and Eastern Railroad
 Chicago South Shore and South Bend Railroad
 CSX Transportation
 Norfolk Southern Railway
 South Shore Line (commuter rail)

Municipalities
The municipalities in LaPorte County and their populations as of the 2010 Census:

Cities

Towns

Census-designated places

Unincorporated communities

Townships
LaPorte County contains 21 townships, more than any other county in the state. The townships, with their populations as of the 2010 Census, are:

Unincorporated towns
Lakeland

Education

K-12 schools
School districts include:
 John Glenn School Corporation
 La Porte Community School Corporation
 Michigan City Area Schools
 New Durham Township Metropolitan School District
 New Prairie United School Corporation
 South Central Community School Corporation
 Tri-Township Consolidated School Corporation

Public libraries
The county is served by five different public library systems:
 LaCrosse Public Library
 LaPorte County Public Library has its main location in La Porte as well as the Coolspring, Fish Lake, Hanna, Kingsford Heights, Rolling Prairie and Union Mills branches.
 Michigan City Public Library
 Wanatah Public Library
 Westville-New Durham Township Public Library has its main location in Westville.

Hospitals
 La Porte Hospital, La Porte – 227 beds
 Franciscan Health Michigan City, Michigan City – 310 beds

Climate and weather 

Education 
Public schools in LaPorte County are administered by seven different districts:
 John Glenn School Corporation
 LaPorte Community School Corporation
 Metropolitan School District of New Durham Township
 Michigan City Area Schools
 New Prairie United School Corporation
 South Central Community School Corporation
 Tri-Township Consolidated School Corporation

Colleges and Universities
 Ivy Tech Community College
 Purdue University Northwest

Government

The county government is a constitutional body and is granted specific powers by the Constitution of Indiana, and by the Indiana Code.

County Council: The county council is the legislative branch of the county government and controls all the spending and revenue collection in the county. Representatives are elected from county districts. The council members serve four-year terms. They are responsible for setting salaries, the annual budget, and special spending. The council also has limited authority to impose local taxes, in the form of an income and property tax that is subject to state level approval, excise taxes, and service taxes.

Board of Commissioners: The executive body of the county is made of a board of commissioners. The commissioners are elected county-wide, in staggered terms, and each serves a four-year term. One of the commissioners, typically the most senior, serves as president. The commissioners are charged with executing the acts legislated by the council, collecting revenue, and managing the day-to-day functions of the county government.

Court: The county has five elected trial court judges. They include the LaPorte Circuit Court and Superior Courts one through four.  The judges are elected to six-year terms on partisan ballots. Superior Courts three and four maintain small claims dockets. Decisions from any trial court may be appealed to the Indiana Court of Appeals. The Circuit Court and Superior court three are located in the city of La Porte; Superior courts one, two and four are located in Michigan City.

County Officials: The county has several other elected offices, including sheriff, coroner, auditor, treasurer, recorder, surveyor, and circuit court clerk. Each of these elected officers serves a term of four years and oversees a different part of county government. Members elected to county government positions are required to declare party affiliations and to be residents of the county.

LaPorte County is split between Indiana's 1st and Indiana's 2nd congressional district and is represented by Rudy Yakym and Frank Mrvan in the United States Congress. It is also part of Indiana Senate districts 5 and 8 and Indiana House of Representatives districts 7,  9, 17 and 20.

County elected officials:

Board of Commissioners:
 Richard Mrozinski (R, 1st)
 Connie Gramarossa (R, 2nd)
 Joe Haney (R, 3rd)

County Council:
 Adam Koronka (R)
 Justin Kiel(R)
 Michael Rosenbaum (R)
 Randall Novak (D)
 Earl Cunningham (R)
 Mike Mollenhauer (D)
 Mark Yagelski (D)

Elected Officials:
 Assessor: Michael R. Schultz (D)
 Auditor: Tim Stabosz (R)
 Clerk: Heather Stevens (R)
 Coroner: Lynn Swanson (R)
 Prosecutor: Sean Fagen (R)
 Recorder: Elzbieta Bilderback (R)
 Sheriff: Ronald C. Heeg (R)
 Surveyor: Anthony C. Hendricks (D)
 Treasurer: Joie Winski (D)

Demographics 

As of the 2010 United States Census, there were 111,467 people, 42,331 households, and 28,228 families residing in the county. The racial makeup of the county was 84.1% white, 10.8% black or African American, 0.5% Asian, 0.3% American Indian, 2.0% from other races, and 2.3% from two or more races. Those of Hispanic or Latino origin made up 5.5% of the population. In terms of ancestry, 30.7% were German, 15.3% were Irish, 11.5% were Polish, 8.3% were English, and 5.9% were American.

Of the 42,331 households, 31.0% had children under the age of 18 living with them, 48.3% were married couples living together, 12.8% had a female householder with no husband present, 33.3% were non-families, and 27.3% of all households were made up of individuals. The average household size was 2.48 and the average family size was 3.00. The median age was 39.6 years.

The median income for a household in the county was $47,697 and the median income for a family was $56,679. Males had a median income of $45,537 versus $30,774 for females. The per capita income for the county was $22,599. About 9.9% of families and 13.8% of the population were below the poverty line, including 22.7% of those under age 18 and 7.1% of those age 65 or over.

See also
 National Register of Historic Places listings in LaPorte County, Indiana

Notes

References

External links 

 
 Access LaPorte County official community site
 Greater LaPorte Chamber of Commerce
 Healthy Communities of LaPorte County

 
Indiana counties
1832 establishments in Indiana
Populated places established in 1832
Northwest Indiana